Rozen Maiden is a manga series by Peach-Pit. It has been adapted into four anime series by Tokyo Broadcasting System. The anime series had its music produced by Mellow Head with soundtrack composed by Shinkichi Mitsumune. In Mellow Head was renamed to On The Run and in later was merged into Lantis. The anime has also produced several theme music and had their anime voice cast used to produce radio dramas. The soundtrack, theme music, and radio dramas were released by Mellow Head, On The Run, and Lantis. Prior to the anime's creation, a radio drama titled Drama CD Rozen Maiden was produced and released by Frontier Works with their own voice cast.

Two radio programs were created by Tokyo Broadcasting System.  is an internet radio program that aired on Lantis Web Radio between May 13, 2005, and September 30, 2005. It was hosted by Miyuki Sawashiro and Asami Sanada, the voice of Shinku and Jun respectively.  was a live radio hosted by Sugintou's voice actress Rie Tanaka during Tokyo Broadcasting System's Anime Festa 2006. Due to positive reception, it was continued through additional CD releases.

Compilation albums

Singles

Soundtracks

Radio dramas

Notes
Notes

References
General

Specific

Rozen Maiden
Lantis (company)
Rozen Maiden